Gertschiola is a genus of Argentinian cellar spiders that was first described by Paolo Marcello Brignoli in 1981.  it contains only two species, found only in Argentina: G. macrostyla and G. neuquena.

See also
 List of Pholcidae species

References

Araneomorphae genera
Pholcidae
Spiders of Argentina